Tru Love may refer to:

 Tru Love (film), a 2013 Canadian film
 "Tru Love" (song), a 2005 song by Faith Evans

See also
True Love (disambiguation)